Kala Pahar, also known as Debbarma Haphong in Khasi, is the highest peak of northern Bangladesh. Located near Robir bazar of Kulaura Upazila in Moulvibazar District, it is only 3–4 hours trekking distance from Azgarabad Tea Estate. This peak is also accessible from Rajki tea estate near Fultola bazar of Juri Upazila. The hill range of Kala Pahar is locally known as Longla Range. 'Kala Pahar' is the local name of the highest peak. According to Bangladesh Geographic society this hill is also known as 'Hararganj pahar'. In Bengali language 'hill' word means 'Pahar'. Situated in the north-eastern part of the country 60% of the range is in Bangladesh and the rest is in the Northern Tripura state of India. In Tripura, part of this hill is known as Raghunandan pahar. The famous ancient religious archaeological site of India ‘Unakoti’ lies at the foot of this hill. Kala Pahar is about 1,100 feet high from the sea level. During autumn, if the sky is clear, one can observe the blue water of Hakaluki haor(Largest haor of Bangladesh) from the high point of Kala Pahar. There are some Khasi establishments adjacent to this hill, such as Nunchora punji, Panaichora punji, Putichora punji and Baigonchora punji.

This place is popular among nature lovers to visit as an adventure day trip.

See also
 Geography of Bangladesh
 List of countries by highest point
 List of mountains of Bangladesh

References

Mountains of Bangladesh
International mountains of Asia
Kulaura Upazila